Salifou Diarrassouba (born 20 December 2001) is a professional footballer who plays as a winger for Ivorian club ASEC Mimosas. He represented Burkina Faso at under-20 international level, and Ivory Coast as an 'A' international (selected for the 2022 African Nations Championship for domestic-based players).

Professional career
Diarrassouba began his career in the Ivory Coast with ASEC Mimosas. He joined St. Gallen on loan on 24 September 2020, for the 2019-20 season. He made his professional debut with St. Gallen in a 3–2 Swiss Super League  loss to FC Zürich on 30 January 2021. On 21 May 2021, he scored his first goal for the club in a 2–1 away win over Servette.

International career
Diarrassouba represented the Burkina Faso U20s at the 2019 Africa U-20 Cup of Nations.

References

External links
 
 SFL Profile

2001 births
21st-century Burkinabé people
Living people
Burkinabé footballers
Ivorian footballers
Burkina Faso youth international footballers
Burkina Faso under-20 international footballers
ASEC Mimosas players
FC St. Gallen players
Ligue 1 (Ivory Coast) players
Swiss Super League players
Swiss 1. Liga (football) players
Association football wingers
Burkinabé expatriate footballers
Ivorian expatriate footballers
Ivorian expatriate sportspeople in Switzerland
Burkinabé expatriate sportspeople in Switzerland
Expatriate footballers in Switzerland
Ivory Coast A' international footballers
2022 African Nations Championship players